Limonada may refer to:

Limeade
Limonada cimarrona a type of limeade, used as a "chaser" in Nicaragua
La Limonada, Guatemala, the largest slum in Latin America outside Brazil 
Limonada, variant of Lemon (card game)  with Uno cards
Limonada, a book by Héctor Zumbado 1978
Limonada, album by Polbo 2009
Limonada (album), album by Kany Garcia 2016
limonada (Barry), the second episode of the third season of American television series Barry